Mammoth Studios is the generic name used for fictional movie studios in movies, television, books and comic books. Mammoth Pictures Studios has appeared in movies such as Bombshell (1933), Abbott and Costello in Hollywood (1945), and Merton of the Movies (1947), as well as the television series The Beverly Hillbillies (from 1964-1971). Four episodes of The Monkees ("I've Got a Little Song Here", "Monkees at the Movies", "The Picture Frame" and "Mijacogeo") from 1966-1968 mention "Mammoth Studio", but not "Mammoth Pictures Studios". Mammoth Pictures Studios has appeared in books such as The Woman Chaser (1960) by Charles Willeford,  and comic books, such as "Blueribbon Comics" (in the 1930s and 1940s) and Marvel's Tower of Shadows in 1970 and the 70’s TV series “Emergency!” Episode 3, ‘Botulism’. But it is never the same studio; the signs and sets are different. In the episodes of The Monkees, Mammoth Studio (not Mammoth Pictures Studios) goes from being active in 1966 (owned by "MD") to being bankrupt and abandoned in 1967 and finally being turned into KXIW, a television station, in 1968. During this same time, Mammoth Pictures Studios was a thriving studio owned by Jed Clampett on episodes of The Beverly Hillbillies, where it was operated by Lawrence Chapman (Milton Frome), proving it to be a different studio. It was last seen February, 2018 in the TV series "Endeavour", series 5 episode 2, "Cartouche". Though the conversion to Television Station KXIW did not occur until 1968 on "The Monkeys," KXIW made an appearance on "Bewitched," on 10 March 1966.

Real Mammoth Studios exist in various countries, such as America, Canada, and Great Britain. Real Mammoth Pictures exists and is a motion picture production company in America.

References

Fictional companies